Q'umirqucha or Q'umir Qucha (Quechua q'umir green, qucha lake, "green lake", hispanicized spelling Jomercocha) is a lake in Peru located in the Cusco Region, Quispicanchi Province, Marcapata District. Q'umirqucha lies south-east of the mountain Wisk'achani and the larger lake Warusqucha, north-east of the village Q'umir Qucha (Ccomer Cocha).

References 

Lakes of Peru
Lakes of Cusco Region